The Kang Chu Sports Park is a sport center in Shalu District, Taichung, Taiwan. The center is the fourth sports park in Taichung.

History
The soft opening of the sport center was done on 21 December 2018 which was attended by Taichung Mayor Lin Chia-lung. It was officially opened on 30 December 2018.

Architecture
The sport center features fitness center, gymnastic room, table tennis room, badminton courts, outdoor roller rink etc. Its façade is painted with blue and white colors.

See also
 Sports in Taiwan

References

External links
  

2018 establishments in Taiwan
Buildings and structures in Taichung
Sports venues completed in 2018
Sports venues in Taiwan